Escondido is a city in San Diego County, California, United States.  Located in the North County region, it was incorporated in 1888, and is one of the oldest cities in San Diego County. It has a population of 151,038 as of the 2020 census.

Etymology
"Escondido" is a Spanish word meaning "hidden". One source says the name originally referred to agua escondida or hidden water; another says it meant "hidden treasure".

The city is known as Eskondiid in Kumeyaay.

History
The Escondido area was first settled by the Luiseño, who established campsites and villages along the creek running through the area. They named the place Mixéelum Pompáwvo or "Mehel-om-pom-pavo." The Luiseno also had another village north of Mixéelum Pompáwvo called Panakare. The Kumeyaay migrated from areas near the Colorado River, settling both in the San Pasqual Valley and near the San Dieguito River in the southwestern and western portions of what is now Escondido. Most of the villages and campsites today have been destroyed by development and agriculture.

Spanish and Mexican eras

Spain controlled the land from the late 18th century to the early 19th century, and established many missions in California to convert the indigenous people. When Mexico gained its independence from Spain, the local land was divided into large ranchos. Most of what is now Escondido occupies the former Rancho Rincon del Diablo ("Devil's Corner"), a Mexican land grant given to Juan Bautista Alvarado (not the governor of the same name) in 1843 by Governor Manuel Micheltorena. Alvarado was a Regidor of Los Angeles at the time, and the first Regidor of the pueblo of San Diego. The southern part of Escondido occupies the former Rancho San Bernardo, granted in 1842 and 1845.

In 1846, during the Mexican–American War, the Battle of San Pasqual was fought southeast of Escondido. This battle pitted Mexican forces under Andrés Pico (brother of then-California-governor Pío Pico) against Americans under Stephen W. Kearny, Archibald Gillespie, and Kit Carson. A park in Escondido is named for Carson.

American era

The city was home to a largely Spanish-speaking population in the first census, taken in 1850 when California became a state. After statehood, non-Hispanic settlers came to Southern California in increasing numbers. The decade of the 1880s is known as the "Southern California Land Boom" because so many people moved to the state.

In 1853, pro-Southern Copperheads proposed dividing the state of California to create a new Territory of Colorado (at this time the territory that would become the state of Colorado was named "Jefferson"). San Diego Judge Oliver S. Witherby suggested placing the capitol of the new territory in Rancho Rincon del Diablo. He envisioned a railroad connecting San Diego to Fort Yuma through an area about two miles (3 km) south of the current Escondido site, heading east through San Pasqual. With a series of deeds in 1855 and 1856, the rancho was transferred from the heirs of Juan Bautista Alvarado to Witherby. He planned to profit from the town that he believed would be established from the dividing point on the railroad below the eastern hills. The proposal for splitting the state and creating the new territory passed in the California legislature, but died in Congress in the run-up to the Civil War. It was effectively killed in 1861 when Congress organized the Territory of Colorado in the area previously occupied by the Jefferson Territory. With Witherby's vision of owning a bustling state capitol unrealized, he set up a mining operation on the rancho instead.

In 1868, Witherby sold the rancho for $8000 to Edward McGeary and John, Josiah, and Matthew Wolfskill. McGeary owned half the rancho, while the three Wolfskill brothers each owned an equal share of the other half. John Wolfskill farmed sheep, horses, and cattle on the rancho for a number of years. Wolfskill had frequent conflicts with the Couts family, owners of the neighboring Guajome, Buena Vista, and San Marcos ranchos, over grazing lands and watering holes.

In October 1883, a group of Los Angeles investors purchased Rancho Rincon del Diablo. This group sold the land to the newly formed Escondido Company in 1884. On December 18, 1885, investors incorporated the Escondido Land and Town Company, and in 1886 this company purchased the  area for approximately $100,000. Two years later, in 1888, Escondido was incorporated as a city; the vote was 64 in favor of cityhood with 12 votes against. Railroads such as the Santa Fe and Southern Pacific were laid in the 1880s. The opening of U.S. Route 395 in 1930 boosted economic growth in Escondido.

Escondido was primarily an agricultural community, growing muscat grapes initially. After a dam was built in 1894-1895 to form what is known today as Lake Wohlford, orange and lemon trees were planted in large numbers, as were olive and walnut trees. By the 1960s, avocados became the largest local crop. Since the 1970s, Escondido has lost most of its agricultural land to housing developments, but still retains a significant agricultural presence in the San Pascual Valley including vineyards, citrus orchards, and avocado orchards.

Geography
The total area is 0.48% water.

The city is growing at a rapid rate. The city proper is surrounded by several sparsely populated unincorporated communities. These include Jesmond Dene and Hidden Meadows to the north; Felicita Park to the southwest; and Rincon Del Diablo to the southeast. Residents of these communities have Escondido mailing addresses and ZIP codes, and their children are sometimes assigned to Escondido schools, but residents of these communities cannot participate in city elections.

The city contains several neighborhoods, including:
Downtown Escondido centers on Grand Avenue between Centre City Parkway and the site of the old Palomar Hospital. The city's general plan defines the Downtown Specific Plan Area as approximately  bounded by Centre City Parkway on the west, Hickory and Ivy Streets on the east, Washington Avenue on the north, and Fifth Avenue on the south, with an additional narrow section extending west along Valley Parkway to Interstate 15. Downtown Escondido includes a mix of coffee shops, restaurants, assorted retail, art galleries, bakeries, a comedy club, and the newly renovated historic Ritz Theater.
Old Escondido Historic District is bounded by Escondido Boulevard on the west, Chestnut Street on the east, Fifth Avenue on the north, and Thirteenth Avenue on the south. This area is made up of mostly single-family residential housing built in the late 1800s and early 1900s in the Victorian and Craftsman styles and is a 5 to 10 minute walk to Grand Avenue in Downtown Escondido.

The Escondido Creek bisects the city. The creek path through the city was developed into a concrete flood control channel in the 1960s. A Class I bicycle path runs along most of the channel's length.

The community of Valley Center is located just north of Escondido. Valley View Casino, owned by the San Pasqual Band of Diegueno Mission Indians, is located in Valley Center.

Natural vegetation types in the Escondido area include chaparral brushland, oak woodland, riparian (stream) woodland, and grassland. The Daley Ranch Preserve north of the city provides a good location to view these natural vegetation types.

Climate
Escondido has a borderline semi-arid climate (Köppen: Bsh) and hot-summer Mediterranean climate (Köppen: Csa) with hot summers and cool wet winters. Owing to its inland setting it is considerably warmer than coastal cities like San Diego, Carlsbad or Oceanside during the summertime, and cooler in the winter. Rainfall totals are higher in the hills to the north and east, with 20-24 inches falling in most areas above 2,000 feet elevation, and over 30 inches on Palomar Mountain, 15 miles east. More than 80% of all precipitation takes place from November through March. Snow is virtually unheard of, though occasionally winter and springtime thunderstorms will drop small hail. The climate is mild enough to allow widespread cultivation of avocados and oranges. Escondido is located in a plant hardiness zone 10a. The hottest temperature recorded in Escondido was 115 °F on September 6, 2020. The coldest temperature recorded in Escondido was 13 °F on January 2, 1901, and January 7, 1913.

Dixon Lake

Dixon Lake is located in the north of Escondido. It is a popular place for picnics, camping, and fishing. Dixon Lake has been granted an Aquaculture Permit by the State of California Department of Fish and Wildlife, so that fishing licenses are no longer required. However, all anglers eight years and older will need daily lake fishing permits, which are available at the concession stand. Throughout the year, the city keeps stocking different types of fish, which include bass, bluegill, carp, catfish, crappie, and trout. Each year the Trout Derby event is also hosted at Dixon Lake.

Demographics

2010 census
In the 2010 United States Census, Escondido had a population of 143,911. The racial makeup was 60.4% White (Non-Hispanic White 40.4%), 2.5% African American (2.1% Non-Hispanic black), 1.0% Native American, 6.1% Asian, 0.2% Pacific Islander, 25.4% from other races, and 4.4% from two or more races. Hispanic or Latino of any race were 48.9% of the population.

The Census reported that 141,792 people (98.5% of the population) lived in households, 1,333 (0.9%) lived in non-institutionalized group quarters, and 786 (0.5%) were institutionalized.

There were 45,484 households, out of which 18,989 (41.7%) had children under the age of 18 living in them, 23,535 (51.7%) were opposite-sex married couples living together, 6,082 (13.4%) had a female householder with no husband present, 3,115 (6.8%) had a male householder with no wife present.  There were 3,121 (6.9%) unmarried opposite-sex partnerships, and 343 (0.8%) same-sex married couples or partnerships. 9,528 households (20.9%) were made up of individuals, and 4,235 (9.3%) had someone living alone who was 65 years of age or older. The average household size was 3.12.  There were 32,732 families (72.0% of all households); the average family size was 3.57.

The age distribution of the population showed 39,778 people (27.6%) under the age of 18, 15,455 people (10.7%) aged 18 to 24, 41,043 people (28.5%) aged 25 to 44, 32,551 people (22.6%) aged 45 to 64, and 15,084 people (10.5%) who were 65 years of age or older.  The median age was 32.5 years. For every 100 females, there were 98.2 males.  For every 100 females age 18 and over, there were 96.1 males.

The homeowner vacancy rate was 2.2%; the rental vacancy rate was 6.0%.  70,936 people (49.3% of the population) lived in owner-occupied housing units and 70,856 people (49.2%) lived in rental housing units.

2000 census
As of the census of 2000, there were 133,559 people, 43,817 households, and 31,153 families residing in the city.  The population density was 1,421.4/km (3,680.9/mi2).  There were 45,050 housing units at an average density of 479.4/km (1,241.6/mi2).  The racial makeup of the city was 67.82% White, 2.25% African American, 1.23% Native American, 4.46% Asian, 0.23% Pacific Islander, 19.19% from other races, and 4.81% from two or more races.  38.70% of the population were Hispanic or Latino of any race.

There were 43,817 households, out of which 39.1% had children under the age of 18 living with them, 53.9% were married couples living together, 11.7% had a female householder with no husband present, and 28.9% were non-families. 22.4% of all households were made up of individuals, and 10.1% had someone living alone who was 65 years of age or older.  The average household size was 3.01 and the average family size was 3.50.

In the city, the age distribution of the population showed 29.7% under the age of 18, 10.4% from 18 to 24, 31.4% from 25 to 44, 17.5% from 45 to 64, and 11.0% who were 65 years of age or older.  The median age was 31 years.  For every 100 females, there were 98.4 males.  For every 100 females age 18 and over, there were 96.1 males.

The median income for a household in the city was $42,567, and the median income for a family was $48,456. Males had a median income of $32,627 versus $27,526 for females. The per capita income for the city was $18,241.  13.4% of the population and 9.3% of families were below the poverty line.  Out of the total population, 17.9% of those under the age of 18 and 5.7% of those 65 and older were living below the poverty line.

The city can be divided into two demographically distinct areas. Peripheral hilly areas to the north, southeast, and southwest are relatively wealthy and populated by non-Hispanic whites, and flat areas adjacent to the downtown are predominantly Hispanic. As of 2006–07 school year, non-Hispanic white children comprised 71.7% of all students in Bernardo Elementary School (southwest), 60.8% of all students in L.R. Green Elementary School (southeast), and 54.7% of all students in Reidy Creek Elementary School (north); In contrast, Farr Avenue, Pioneer and Lincoln Elementary schools (three large schools just north of the downtown) all have more than 85% of Hispanic and less than 6% non-Hispanic white students.

Crime
In 2007, the city ranked #65 by violent crimes per capita and #58 by property crimes per capita among 165 cities in California with populations greater than 50,000. Compared with the 12 largest cities in San Diego County, it ranked 6th in both categories. Its crime rate was lower in both categories than San Diego, El Cajon, and National City; higher in both categories than San Marcos, Carlsbad, Encinitas, and Santee. Escondido had a higher violent crime rate but lower property crime rate than La Mesa and Chula Vista; it had a lower violent crime rate but higher property crime rate than Vista and Oceanside.

However, since 2008, Escondido has seen a drop in overall crime. In 2009, 629 violent crimes and 3,880 property crimes were reported in Escondido. There were four murders and non-negligent manslaughters, 42 rapes, 249 robberies, 334 aggravated assaults, 779 burglaries, 2,402 larceny thefts, 699 vehicle thefts, and 23 arsons. In 2010, Escondido saw a 5 percent drop in violent crime, with only 597 reported violent crimes according to the Escondido Police Officer's Association. However, there was a 3.9 percent increase in the number of property crimes, including residential and commercial burglaries, from 3,880 in 2009 to 4,033 in 2010, according to FBI statistics. In 2011, violent crime has decreased by 17.09% as compared to the same period in 2010. Leading the reduction is rape which is down 24.32%. Armed robberies went down 23.86%, followed by aggravated assault which is down 16.81%. There were 3 homicides in the city, the same as the previous year.

Economy

Residents work in a range of industries. Out of the approximately 64,000 employed civilian residents over the age of 16, 15% work in educational, health care and social services; 13% in retail trade; 13% in construction; 12% in professional, scientific, management, administrative, and waste management services; 11% in arts, entertainment, recreation, and accommodation and food services; 11% in manufacturing; and 11% in other services.

Top employers
According to the city's 2021 Comprehensive Annual Financial Report, the top employers in the city are:

In 2006, Stone Brewing Co. moved its headquarters and brewery from San Marcos, California to a new, much larger facility in the Quail Hills area of Escondido. Dr. Bronner's Magic Soaps is also located in the city.

Shopping
The Farmers Market in downtown Escondido is a certified Farmers Market that showcases fresh-picked California-grown fruits, vegetables, and flowers.
The Escondido Swap Market has operated over 40 years, and features used and new merchandise and food.
Westfield North County, which opened in 1986, is an indoor shopping mall on Via Rancho Parkway in southern Escondido. It features JC Penney, Macy's, and Target.

Arts and culture

Downtown

Downtown has become more active in the past few years with the opening of restaurants, cafes, and galleries. 
A satellite location of the Mingei International Museum, a well-known museum of folk art from around the world, occupied the former J.C. Penney building on Grand Avenue from 2003 to 2010. One block off Grand Ave. is Grape Day Park with the civic center and the California Center for the Arts, which features two theaters, a visual arts museum, an educational complex, and a conference center. Grape Day Park also hosts the Escondido History Center, an independent non-profit museum. San Diego Children's Discovery Museum, across the street on N Broadway, features hands-on exhibits and programs for children up to 10 years of age, with an authentically regional perspective on natural and social science. The History Center features the city's original Santa Fe Depot, first library, Victorian house, barn, and blacksmith shop. The Pioneer Room of Escondido Public Library (located in the Mathes Center building next to the Main Library) offers photographs, maps, oral histories, genealogical collections, directories and yearbooks documenting Escondido's history. On Friday evenings a car rally called Cruisin' Grand takes place on seven blocks of Grand Avenue, featuring pre-1970 vintage cars every year from April to September.

The Escondido Arts Partnership, a non-profit art organization established in 1995, created and hosts the Second Saturday Art Walk, involving several galleries and museums in Escondido. It also has a Municipal Gallery including five galleries and five art study spaces. It operates the Betty Woodaman Memorial Art Library, a donated-based art library that offers art books local community, and publishes an annual collection of poetry and art called "Summation".

Sports
From 1964 to 1968, the San Diego Chargers held training camp in Escondido.

In 1981, Escondido National Little League became the 19th team to make it to the Little League World Series from the state of California. The team was first District 31 champions, then District 8 champions. They then won the Southern California Divisional Tournament at Youth Athletic Park by beating San Bernardino Civitan 3–2 in the quarterfinals, then beating Granada Hills American 5–1 in the semifinals and then beating Ladera National 7–5 in the finals to earn a trip to the Western Regional. At the Western Regional in San Bernardino, the Escondido team won four straight games to earn the trip to Williamsport.

In October 2010, Merritt Paulson, owner of the AAA Portland Beavers franchise, announced that the team was being sold to the North County Baseball ownership group, led by Jeff Moorad, part-owner and CEO of the Beavers parent team, the San Diego Padres. The ownership group discussed building a stadium in Escondido to become operational for the 2012 baseball season at the earliest. In December 2010, the Escondido city council voted to go ahead with the ballpark. The stadium was slated to open in April 2013. However, the plan to move the team fell through in late 2011.

The San Diego Sabers of the United States Premier Hockey League play at the Iceoplex in Escondido.

Parks and recreation

Parks
Escondido has fifteen parks.

Daley Ranch is a  conservation area acquired in 1996 by the City of Escondido and is managed in perpetuity for the preservation of a biologically unique and diverse habitat area of regional importance. Six distinct trails cover most of the property. Most popular are the Boulder Loop Trail (2.4 miles) which affords views of Escondido, and the Ranch House Loop (2.5 miles), which passes two small ponds and the site of Daley's original log cabin. Several species of oak trees are common, as well as chaparral (brushland). Wildlife include deer, coyote, bobcats, rabbits and hawks. Cougars are sometimes present, but not frequently seen.
El Norte Park is a small "green lung" park, off El Norte Parkway in northern Escondido. It features mature trees and a kids playground.

 Kit Carson Park is a 285-acre municipal park featuring 3 ponds, multiple sports fields, playgrounds, a disc golf course, an arboretum, and Queen Califia's Magical Circle, the last major international work by French artist Niki de Saint Phalle. De Saint Phalle, a colleague of Salvador Dalí and Jasper Johns, is best known for her Stravinsky Fountain, located in Paris, France. The artist chose Escondido as the site for her final work because it reminded her of Italy.
Grape Day Park is located behind the Escondido City Hall and the performing arts complex. This park was named after the annual grape day harvest, an event held on the first Saturday after Labor Day from 1908 to 1950.
Jesmond Dene Park in North Escondido features 3 ball fields, a playground, and BBQs.

Dixon Lake supplies Escondido with fresh water and is a popular location for fishing, as fishing permits can be purchased at the store on site. Swimming is not allowed but rowboats, motorized boats, and pedal boats are available for rental. Dixon Lake has about 34 campsites which look out over the lake and/or over Escondido. There are several trails that follow the shoreline of Dixon Lake, as well as several fishing areas and floating docks on both sides of the lake. While entrance to the park is free, the city charges $5.00 on Saturdays and Sundays for taking a car into the park. However, ample free parking next to the trailheads of Daley Ranch is available outside the Dixon Lake gate.
Lake Wohlford is in the northeast corner of Escondido. The lake has some walking trails around the perimeter and allows fishing.  In addition, the northern shore is home to the Lake Wohlford Cafe, founded in 1949 and prominently featuring locally caught catfish in its menus.
Mountain View
Rod McLeod Park is an 18-acre green space offering a tot lot, a paved trail, restrooms, benches, picnic tables, and BBQs.
Washington Park is an urban park located on the eastern side of central Escondido. It features lighted facilities for baseball, softball, tennis and basketball, a 25-yard swimming pool and water slide, and a smaller children's pool. The park's numerous mature trees create plenty of shady areas and tables are provided for picnics.
Westside
Frances Ryan Park is a  complex of soccer fields, supported by a concession stand and public restrooms.  The park is adjacent to Valley High School in eastern Escondido at the corner of Valley Parkway and El Norte Parkway.  As of October 2010, the park features 7 soccer fields, 5 of which have lights for night time practice and play.  The park is named for a former teacher at Escondido High School.
Grove Park was so named to recognize the city's agricultural history. It was built about 2008 (approximate date).
Felicita County Park

San Diego Zoo Safari Park
The San Diego Zoo Safari Park (also known by its former name, "Wild Animal Park") is located near Escondido, in the San Pasqual Valley within the city limits of San Diego. It is the sister park to the San Diego Zoo. The Safari Park shows animals in open habitats.

Government

Local

Escondido is governed by a council-manager system. The city council consists of a mayor and four City Council members. Along with the City Treasurer, they are elected at large to four-year terms. The current mayor is Dane White. Current City Council members are Consuelo Martinez, Jose M. Garcia, and Michael Morasco. The current City Manager is Sean McGlynn. The current City Treasurer is Douglas Shultz. The most recent election was held on November 8, 2022.

A 2005 nationwide study listed the city of Escondido as one of the most conservative cities in America. The city is particularly known for its positions on illegal immigration. Approximately half of the population is Hispanic, and then-council member Sam Abed estimated in 2006 that 35,000 people, or 25% of the city population, are undocumented. Since 2010 federal immigration officials have worked out of the Escondido police station in an unprecedented city-federal partnership. In 2006 the city council proposed and then abandoned an ordinance to punish landlords who rent to illegal immigrants. Due to a public outcry and legal challenges to that proposed housing ordinance, as well as the election of Diaz to the City Council, the council has ceased any overt measures against illegal immigrants. Council policies now focus on "quality of life" issues instead. Periodic police checkpoints are set up which randomly stop drivers to check drivers licenses, registration, and insurance. An overnight parking ordinance has been proposed that would limit the number of cars each household can legally park on city streets. The city is estimated to have lost as much as a quarter of its non-citizen population between 2006 and 2007; Latino activists attribute this to a perception of the city as hostile to immigrants.

The City of Escondido is a member of the San Diego Association of Governments (SANDAG).

State and federal representation

Politics
 
In the United States presidential election of 2008, 53.3% of voters residing in incorporated Escondido voted for John McCain, 44.9% for Barack Obama, and 1.8% for a third-party candidate. Unincorporated areas were considerably more conservative: among voters in neighborhoods of Rincon Del Diablo, Hidden Meadows, and Valley Center, 62.3%, 65.5%, 66.9% of voters respectively cast their votes for McCain. A survey by The Bay Area Center for Voting Research found that among American cities with populations over 100,000, Escondido was the 11th most conservative city in the United States based on voting results in the 2004 presidential election.

Education
Escondido is served by the Escondido Union School District, the Escondido Union High School District, and the San Pasqual Union School District. These three public school districts serve the City of Escondido and the Unincorporated communities such as: Jesmond Dene, North Ridge, Hidden Meadows, Deer Springs, San Pasqual Valley, Del Dios, Elfin Forrest, East Canyon, Cloverdale, and Lake Wolford. The city has 19 elementary, seven middle, and seven high schools. Escondido Adult School was established in 1968 by the Escondido Union High School District. Escondido Adult School is a provider of adult education services in Escondido and its surrounding communities. Escondido Adult School offers adult education services for adults in the areas of: high school diploma, GED, HISET, adult basic education, ESL, parenting classes, community education courses, and career technical education courses. Escondido Adult School also offers a robust selection of short-term medical training courses such as: Certified Nurse Assistant, Certified Home Health Aide, Medical Assistant, Pharmacy Technician, Phlebotomy, Medical Billing and Coding, CPR/BLS training and certification, and Veterinary Assistant. Escondido Adult School is a member of the Education to Career Network of North San Diego County. ETCN is one of 71 consortiums in the State of California and is funded by the California Adult Education Program.

Public Post-Secondary schools:
Escondido Adult School and 
Palomar College-Escondido Campus

Public high schools:
Escondido High School
Orange Glen High School
San Pasqual High School
Classical Academy High School
Escondido Charter High School
Valley High School
Del Lago Academy: Campus of Applied Science
Balboa School

Middle schools:

 Classical Academy Middle School 
 Bear Valley Middle School 
 Del Dios Middle School 
 Heritage Junior High School 
 Hidden Valley Middle School 
 Mission Middle School 
 Rincon Middle School
 Quantum Academy Middle School

Elementary schools
Bernardo Elementary
Central Elementary
Classical Academy
Coastal Academy
Conway Elementary
Farr Avenue Elementary
Felicita Elementary
Glen View Elementary
Heritage K-8 Charter
Juniper Elementary
L. R. Green Elementary
Lincoln Elementary
Miller Elementary
North Broadway Elementary
Oak Hill Elementary
Orange Glen Elementary
Pioneer Elementary
Reidy Creek Elementary
Rock Springs Elementary
Rose Elementary

There is a wide range of API scores for Escondido schools, reflecting the demographic diversity of the city. As of 2009, two elementary schools in the district scored above the 80th percentile of all schools in the state, and nine elementary schools scored below the 20th percentile.

The Escondido Public Library system consists of the Main Branch, the Pioneer Room, Computer Center, and a bookmobile.

Westminster Seminary California is located in Escondido.
In 2013 John Paul the Great Catholic University relocated its main campus to Escondido.

Infrastructure

Transportation

Two highways serve Escondido: Route 78 and Interstate 15. Route 78 enters from the west as a freeway which ends at Broadway. The highway follows surface streets and leaves the city heading east into the San Pasqual Valley.

The North County Transit District (NCTD) operates local bus service, with the Escondido Transit Center serving as a hub. The transit center has connections to both the San Diego Metropolitan Transit System and the Riverside Transit Agency.

The Sprinter light rail line, operated by NCTD, links the transit center to Oceanside using the existing -long Escondido Branch trackage of the San Diego Northern Railroad. The rail line opened in 2008, making Escondido one of the first cities in the United States to operate Siemens Desiro class diesel multiple units manufactured in Germany. At the Oceanside Transit Center, the Sprinter connects to three commuter rail lines (the Coaster, Orange County and Inland Empire-Orange County lines) and is also served by Amtrak's Pacific Surfliner.

The California High Speed Rail Authority listed Escondido as a stop along the proposed high-speed rail system running from Southern to Northern California.

Utilities
San Diego Gas & Electric is the electric utility for the city. The City of Escondido Water Utilities serves most customers within the city while Rincon del Diablo Municipal Water District serves potable and recycled water to the greater Escondido valley and some portions of the incorporated city.

Health care
Palomar Medical Center is a hospital located in west Escondido near the I-15/78 interchange. It is the only designated trauma center in northern San Diego County. It opened in 2012, replacing a PMC facility that has stood in central Escondido since 1950. The original Palomar hospital, located east of downtown at the Valley Parkway/Grand Avenue junction, remained open and was rebranded Palomar Medical Center Downtown, serving as a standby/overflow medical center until 2021, when it was scheduled for demolition. The building was completely demolished in 2022.

Religion
Westminster Seminary California is located in Escondido.

The Meeting of the Lord Monastery is located at 14952 Stonebridge Road outside of Escondido. The monastery, in the care of V. Rev. Milan Vuković, is under the omophorion of Bishop Maksim Vasiljević of the Serbian Orthodox Church.

Ascension Lutheran Church is a Christian church of the Wisconsin Evangelical Lutheran Synod in Escondido.

Deer Park Monastery is a Buddhist sanctuary that occupies  in the hills north of Escondido and west of Daley Ranch. It is one of three monasteries in the United States under the direction of well-known Zen teacher Thich Nhat Hanh.

Notable people
Korey Lee: Major League Baseball Player. Catcher for the Houston Astros. Born in Escondido, California 
Anacani: featured singer with the Lawrence Welk orchestra
Tom Anderson: co-founder of MySpace
Lester Bangs: rock music critic
Texas Rose Bascom: movie actress, "World's Greatest Female Trick Roper," National Cowgirl Hall of Fame inductee
Billy Bevan: silent and talkies movie actor, born Orange, New South Wales, Australia 1887; died Escondido, California 1957.
Ken Block: rally car driver, and founder of DC Shoes
Harold F. Blum: physiologist who first explored sunlight-induced skin cancer
Sam Brannan: California's first millionaire
E. H. Bronner: soapmaker
Ray Conniff: bandleader and arranger
Joe Coscarart, former Boston Braves infielder
Pete Coscarart: former Brooklyn Dodgers infielder
D. D. Crabb, rancher and Arizona State Senator
Gavvy Cravath: former right fielder for the Philadelphia Phillies
Richard Denning: actor, An Affair to Remember, Creature from the Black Lagoon; died in Escondido
Olga Diaz: politician, former city council member and coffee shop owner, lives in Escondido
Caitlin Glass: voice actress and ADR director
Robert Klark Graham: eugenicist and inventor, founder of the Repository for Germinal Choice ("Nobel Prize Sperm Bank")
Chapman Grant (1887–1983) herpetologist, historian
Steve Hendrickson: former Chargers football player
George Horine: held world record in the high jump; won an Olympic bronze medal
Randy Johnson: Major League infielder, special assistant to Oakland A's GM Billy Beane; graduate of Escondido High School
Jacque Jones: former baseball player for the Minnesota Twins
Jovan Kirovski: forward for the L.A. Galaxy MLS team
Elisabeth Kübler-Ross: founder and resident of the "Shanti Nilaya" (Home of Peace), retreat in Escondido in the late 1970s and early 1980s
Caleb Lieurance: philosopher from Westmont College; pianist, kazooist, and slide-whistle player
Jim Londos: professional wrestler
Shannon MacMillan: professional soccer player and graduate of San Pasqual High School
Anthony Menconi: marine engineer from California Maritime Academy
Haley Moore: amateur golfer
Deborah Jeane Palfrey: the so-called D.C. Madam
Robbie Peralta: MMA UFC fighter
 Pamela Radcliff: historian and professor at the University of California at San Diego and an authority on the history of modern Spain.<ref>Radcliff, Pamela. [http://citeseerx.ist.psu.edu/viewdoc/download?doi=10.1.1.694.9542&rep=rep1&type=pdf Interpreting the 20th Century: The Struggle Over Democracy] , The Great Courses. The Teaching Company, 2004. Accessed October 18, 2017. "Pamela Radcliff, Ph.D. Associate Professor, Department of History; University of California, San Diego - Pamela Radcliff was born in Passaic, New Jersey, and grew up in Clifton, New Jersey, and Escondido, California."</ref>
Mark Redman: professional baseball player and graduate of Escondido High School
Steve Reeves: bodybuilder, Mr. Universe, and actor, Hercules; died in Escondido 
Travis Ryan: lead vocalist of Cattle Decapitation
Brett Salisbury: college football quarterback, member of Escondido's 1981 Little League World Series team, and younger brother of Sean Salisbury.
Sean Salisbury: former NFL quarterback and ESPN anchorman, and graduate of Orange Glen High School; older brother of Brett Salisbury
Brian Simnjanovski: punter for the Berlin Thunder, New York Jets, Arizona Cardinals, and Tampa Bay Buccaneers NFL teams
Riley Steele: pornographic actress
Randy Vasquez: actor
Eric Weddle: free safety for the NFL San Diego Chargers; resides in Escondido
Royce Williams: ace Navy pilot during the Korean War
Harold Bell Wright: author in the 1920s and 1930s
Andrea Zittel: contemporary artist, graduate of San Pasqual High School
Kevin Kiner: film and television composer

See also
Daily Times-Advocate – Escondido's hometown newspaper

North County Times
Rincon bleachersThe Road to Escondido'', an album by J.J. Cale, Colin Tappe and Eric Clapton

Notes

References

External links

 

 
Cities in San Diego County, California
North County (San Diego County)
San Diego metropolitan area
Incorporated cities and towns in California
Populated places established in 1888
1888 establishments in California